The Boulet Brothers' Dragula: Titans is a spin-off edition of The Boulet Brothers' Dragula and features past contestants from that series returning to compete. The series was announced on September 12, 2022 and premiered on October 25, 2022 on Shudder.

The cast for Titans was revealed on September 26, 2022 and includes 10 contestants returning from past seasons of Dragula.

Contestants

Notes:

Contestant progress
Legend:

Guest judges

Episode summary

References

2021 American television seasons
2021 in LGBT history
The Boulet Brothers' Dragula
2020s LGBT-related television series